"Hurdy Gurdy Man" is a single released by the British Rock band The Spectres (a predecessor of Status Quo) in 1966. This was the band's second single, and first to be penned by a member of the band. It was written by Alan Lancaster and a writer who sold his rights to the song to Pat Barlow. The B-side, although only credited to Lancaster, was co-written by Rick Parfitt, who at the time was not an official member of the band.

Track listing 
 "Hurdy Gurdy Man" (Lancaster/Barlow) (3.15)
 "Laticia" (Lancaster) (3.00)

References 

1966 singles
Song recordings produced by John Schroeder (musician)
1966 songs